William Royce may refer to:
 William Royce (politician), English politician
 William James Royce, American playwright, director, screenwriter, and novelist
 William Hobart Royce, American writer and bookseller
 Bill Royce, college football player